The Olympic qualification event (branded as the 2021 Olympic Qualification Event presented by Asito for sponsorship reasons) is an international curling tournament that was held from 5–18 December 2021 in Leeuwarden, Netherlands. 

The first international curling tournament to be hosted by the Netherlands, the event was the final qualifier for curling at the 2022 Winter Olympics, and was established as part of changes to the qualification process necessitated due to the COVID-19 pandemic. The tournament was played between the men's, women's, and mixed doubles teams that qualified for the 2020 or 2021 World Curling Championships, but had yet to qualify for the Olympics, joined by additional teams who qualified through a pre-qualification tournament in November.

The top three National Olympic Committees (NOCs) in the men's and women's tournaments, and the top two NOCs in the mixed doubles tournament, advanced to the Olympic curling tournament. Denmark, Italy, and Norway qualified to the men's tournament. Great Britain, Japan, and South Korea qualified to the women's tournament, while Australia and the United States qualified in mixed doubles.

Sponsorship controversy
Live streaming of the mixed doubles event was cancelled by some international broadcasters, including NBC and NHK, due to the sponsorship of a Dutch sex toy store, EasyToys, whose logo appeared on the ice. Following the mixed doubles event, the ads were replaced with the statement "#equalityforall" for the women's and men's events.

Mixed doubles

Qualification

World Ranking

Teams

Round robin standings
Final Round Robin Standings

Round robin results
All draw times are listed in Central European Time (UTC+01:00).

Draw 1
Sunday, December 5, 9:00

Draw 2
Sunday, December 5, 12:30

Draw 3
Sunday, December 5, 16:00

Draw 4
Sunday, December 5, 19:30

Draw 5
Monday, December 6, 10:00

Draw 6
Monday, December 6, 14:30

Draw 7
Monday, December 6, 19:00

Draw 8
Tuesday, December 7, 9:00

Draw 9
Tuesday, December 7, 12:30

Draw 10
Tuesday, December 7, 16:00

Draw 11
Tuesday, December 7, 19:30

Draw 12
Wednesday, December 8, 10:00

Draw 13
Wednesday, December 8, 14:30

Draw 14
Wednesday, December 8, 19:00

Playoffs

Semifinal 1
Thursday, December 9, 9:00

Semifinal 2
Thursday, December 9, 9:00

Qualification Game 1
Thursday, December 9, 15:00

Qualification Game 2
Thursday, December 9, 18:00

Men

Qualification

World Ranking

Teams

Round robin standings
Final Round Robin Standings

Round robin results
All draw times are listed in Central European Time (UTC+01:00).

Draw 1
Saturday, December 11, 14:00

Draw 2
Sunday, December 12, 9:00

Draw 3
Sunday, December 12, 19:00

Draw 4
Monday, December 13, 14:00

Draw 5
Tuesday, December 14, 9:00

Draw 6
Tuesday, December 14, 19:00

Draw 7
Wednesday, December 15, 14:00

Draw 8
Thursday, December 16, 9:00

Draw 9
Thursday, December 16, 19:00

Playoffs

Qualification Game 1
Friday, December 17, 15:00

Qualification Game 2
Saturday, December 18, 15:00

Women

Qualification

World Ranking

Teams

Round robin standings
Final Round Robin Standings

Round robin results
All draw times are listed in Central European Time (UTC+01:00).

Draw 1
Saturday, December 11, 9:00

Draw 2
Saturday, December 11, 19:00

Draw 3
Sunday, December 12, 14:00

Draw 4
Monday, December 13, 9:00

Draw 5
Monday, December 13, 19:00

Draw 6
Tuesday, December 14, 14:00

Draw 7
Wednesday, December 15, 9:00

Draw 8
Wednesday, December 15, 19:00

Draw 9
Thursday, December 16, 14:00

Playoffs

Three teams, Japan, South Korea and Latvia qualified for the play-offs to decide the final two places at Beijing 2022. The teams finishing second and third, South Korea and Japan, face off in the first Qualifier; the winner qualifies for Beijing. The loser then faces fourth-placed Latvia in the second and final qualifier, with the winner of that match taking the final place in Beijing.

Qualification Game 1
Friday, December 17, 10:00

Qualification Game 2
Saturday, December 18, 10:00

References

2021 in Dutch sport
Qualification for the 2022 Winter Olympics
2021 in curling
Olympic Qualification Event
Sport in Leeuwarden
Curling in the Netherlands